Lawrence Attard (born 6 June 1966) is a Maltese retired football defender.

References

1966 births
Living people
Maltese footballers
Hibernians F.C. players
Association football forwards
Malta international footballers